Potomac Falls High School is a public secondary school in Sterling, Virginia unincorporated area in Loudoun County. The school is part of the Loudoun County Public Schools system.

History

Potomac Falls High School opened in 1997. It was the first high school built in the county in 21 years, following Park View's opening in 1976. 

The high school design for Potomac Falls has been used for every new high school built in Loudoun County since then.  Stone Bridge opened in 2000 with Potomac Falls' design, but with a larger auditorium and some additional classrooms.  Heritage, Dominion, Briar Woods, Freedom, Woodgrove, Tuscarora, John Champe, also all use the same design. The design remained but was updated for Rock Ridge and Riverside.

Lawsuits
Demmon v. Loudoun County Public Schools, 342 F.Supp.2d 474 (E.D. Va. 2004) – As a fundraiser, a parent organization offered parents and community members the opportunity to purchase and order inscriptions for paving bricks to be placed in a sidewalk around the flagpoles at Potomac Falls High School. Purchasers could choose text and/or symbols to be inscribed on the bricks. Some purchasers paid to have their bricks inscribed with a Latin cross. After one parent complained, school officials removed from the walkway every brick containing a cross symbol.

Case Status – The court held that free speech rights of parents were violated where the school removed bricks inscribed with a Latin cross.  The court held that symbols were not school-sponsored speech; and that a walkway where the bricks were displayed constituted a designated or limited public forum and that the school engaged in prohibited “viewpoint discrimination.” The bricks were later reinstated.

Demographics
In the 2018-2019 year there were 1,634 students enrolled in Potomac Falls High School.

Enrollment by race/ethnicity was 50.67% White, 22.34% Hispanic, 12.73% Asian, 8.63% Black, and 5.63% other.

Enrollment by gender was 52.39% Male and 47.61% Female.

Accreditation and test scores

Accreditation
Potomac Falls is a fully accredited high school based on its overall performance on the Standards of Learning tests in Virginia.

SAT scores
The average SAT score in 2006 for Potomac Falls was a 1,555 (532 in Math; 517 in Critical Reading; 506 in Writing).

Enrollment history

Extracurricular activities

Athletics
Sports teams play in the 5A Dulles District and Region II.  At its opening, the Panthers played in the AAA Concorde District and the Northern Region. Potomac Falls played in the Concorde District nevertheless partly because Park View and Broad Run were also in the Northern Region but played in the Liberty District, and it was assumed that most AA sized high schools in Northern Virginia, like George C. Marshall High School, would play up in AAA.

Since Potomac Falls' move to AA in 1999, the athletic teams have enjoyed much success, particularly in their soccer programs.  Potomac Falls has won seven AA state titles, two girls soccer titles in 2000 and 2004, one in boys soccer in 2006, one in boys golf in 2001, two in boys basketball in 2010 and 2011, and one in boys tennis in 2002. In 2017, the Varsity girls field hockey team received a regional title, and placed third in the group 5a state tournament.  
The cheerleaders of Potomac Falls received the regional and district title in 2006, and placed 3rd in the state. In 2008, the cheerleaders also took the district title.  The Panther Dancers (Potomac Falls Dance Team) won a state title in their jazz routine in November 2006.

The Potomac Falls Boys Cross Country team  has consecutively won the Dulles District AA title since the 2001–2002 Season to 2010. As of the end of the 2010 season, it has won 10 Dulles District titles in a row.

The Potomac Falls Boys Swim Team won the Dulles District AA Title in the 2002-2003 season, and many swimmers have performed well at the regional and state meets. Matt McLean, a 2006 graduate and member of the swim team, competed at the University of Virginia and was a gold medalist at 2012 London Olympics in the Men's 4x200 Freestyle Relay, the record setting relay that gave Michael Phelps his 19th gold medal.

The boys basketball team has been doing very well over the past few years. Greg Graves was named the Virginia High School Coaches Association Division 4 Player of the Year for the state of Virginia for the 2011-2012 season. Lukas Mihailovich was also player of the year, led the Panthers to back to back state titles, and played at James Madison University

Band
The Potomac Falls band has earned the title of Virginia Honor Band by the Virginia Band and Orchestra Directors Association (VBODA) over eight times since its opening in 1997 (1998–2014)(2012), attaining overall "superior" ratings at both the State Marching Band Festival each of those years.

Notable alumni 
 2006 graduate Matt McLean won a gold medal in swimming at the 2012 London Olympics.
 2009 graduate Conor Shanosky played for DC United 2009–2014.
 2005 graduate Adrian Tracy played college football at William & Mary and later played for the New York Giants.

Notes

Public high schools in Virginia
Educational institutions established in 1997
Northern Virginia Scholastic Hockey League teams
Schools in Loudoun County, Virginia
1997 establishments in Virginia